Ataullah Guerra (born 14 November 1987) is a Trinidadian international footballer.

International career

International goals
Scores and results list Trinidad and Tobago's goal tally first.

References

1987 births
Living people
Trinidad and Tobago footballers
Trinidad and Tobago expatriate footballers
Trinidad and Tobago international footballers
TT Pro League players
Veikkausliiga players
USL Championship players
Morvant Caledonia United players
San Juan Jabloteh F.C. players
Central F.C. players
Rovaniemen Palloseura players
Charleston Battery players
2014 Caribbean Cup players
2015 CONCACAF Gold Cup players
Association football midfielders
Expatriate footballers in Finland
Expatriate soccer players in the United States